The Eddy Cortés National Gymnasium, better known as National Gymnasium, is a sports arena located in La Sabana Metropolitan Park, San José, Costa Rica. Its capacity is over 4,000.

History 
The gymnasium was opened on 19 February 1960. President Mario Echandi Jiménez was present at the inauguration. The arena was originally used for bullfights, and it originally did not have a roof. After being used for decades, the building fell into disrepair, as teams complained about the leaking roof, small size of the gymnasium, and worn out electrical system. Soon after, the roof was changed in 2012 and the ventilation system, electrical wiring and electronic marker control console were fixed in 2015.

Today, the structure is mostly used for basketball games, gymnastics competitions, graduation ceremonies, and other events.

Concerts 
Despite being used mostly as a sporting venue, Gimnasio Nacional is occasionally used for concerts. Santana's concert here on 29 September 1973 holds the distinction of the first rock concert held in Costa Rica.

References 

Sports venues completed in 1960
Indoor arenas in Costa Rica
Sport in San José, Costa Rica
Buildings and structures in San José, Costa Rica
Buildings and structures in San José Province
Basketball venues in Costa Rica